Far Out is a collection of 13 science fiction short stories by American writer Damon Knight. The stories were originally published between 1949 and 1960 in Galaxy Magazine, If Science Fiction and other science fiction magazines. There is an introduction by Anthony Boucher.

The book contains the  story "To Serve Man", which was later adapted for television.

Contents
 Introduction
 "To Serve Man"
 "Idiot Stick"
 "Thing of Beauty"
 "The Enemy"
 "Not with a Bang"
 "Babel II"
 "Anachron"
 "Special Delivery"
 "You're Another"
 "Time Enough"
 "Extempore"
 "Cabin Boy"
 "The Last Word"

External links
 Knight, Damon (1961), Far Out, Simon & Schuster, New York

1961 short story collections
Science fiction short story collections
Works by Damon Knight